The Governess of the Children of France (sometimes the Governess of the Royal Children) was an office at the royal French court during pre-Revolutionary France and the Bourbon Restoration. She was charged with the education of the children and grandchildren of the monarch. The holder of the office was taken from the highest-ranking nobility of France. The governess was supported by various deputies or under-governesses (sous gouvernantes).

Governesses of the Children of France

Children of Louis XII of France
 Michelle de Saubonne

Children of Francis I of France

 Charlotte Gouffier de Boisy, Madame de Cossé-Brissac
 Guillemette de Sarrebruck, comtesse de Braine

Children of Henry II of France
 1544–1557: Françoise de Contay (d. 1557), Madame d'Humières, Dame de Contay.
 Marie-Catherine Gondi, 'Madame Duperon' (d. 1570), sous gouvernante (deputy)
 Charlotte de Curton (d. 1575), sous gouvernante (deputy)
 Louise de Clermont (1504–1596), comtesse de Tonnerre and duchesse d’Uzès. 
 Claude Catherine de Clermont (1543–1603), Duchess of Retz.

Children of Charles IX of France
 1572–1578: Isabelle de Crissé.

Children of Henry IV of France
 1601–1625: Françoise de Longuejoue, baronne de Montglat (d. 1633)

Children of Louis XIII

 1638–1643: Françoise de Lansac (1583–1657)
 1643–1646: Marie-Catherine de Senecey (1588–1677)

Children of Louis XIV
1661–1664: Julie d'Angennes, (1607–1671) duchesse de Montausier 
1661–1672: Louise de Prie, (1624–1709), Marquise of Toucy, Duchess of Cardona

Children of the Grand Dauphin

1682–1691: Louise de Prie, (1624–1709), Marquise of Toucy, Duchess of Cardona

Children of the Duke of Burgundy

1709–1710: Marie Isabelle Gabrielle Angélique de La Mothe-Houdancourt (1654–1726), Duchess of La Ferté-Senneterre
1710–1735: Charlotte de La Mothe-Houdancourt, (1651–1744), Duchess of Ventadour
Anne Julie de Melun acted as a sous gouvernante to Madame de Ventadour
 1704–1717: Madame de La Lande
'1710–1717: Marie-Suzanne de Valicourt

Children of Louis XV

1727–1735: Charlotte de La Mothe-Houdancourt, (1654–1744), Duchess of Ventadour.
1735–1754: Marie Isabelle de Rohan, (1699–1754), Duchess of Tallard
1727–1746: Madame de La Lande, sous gouvernante (deputy)
1727–1744: Marie-Suzanne de Valicourt, sous gouvernante (deputy)
1729–?: Marguerite d'Armand de Mizon, sous gouvernante (deputy)

Children of Louis, Dauphin of France

1735–1754: Marie Isabelle de Rohan, (1699–1754), Duchess of Tallard
1754–1776: Marie Louise de Rohan, (1720–1803), Countess of Marsan
 1771–1778: Marie Angélique de Mackau, sous gouvernante (deputy)

Children of Louis XVI
1776–1782: Victoire de Rohan, (1743–1807), Princess of Guéméné
1782–1789: Yolande de Polastron, (1749–1793), Duchess of Polignac.
1789–1792: Louise Élisabeth de Croÿ, (1749–1832), Marquise of Tourzel.
 1776–1792: Marie Angélique de Mackau, sous gouvernante (deputy)
 1781–1792: Renée Suzanne de Soucy, sous gouvernante (deputy)
 1785–1792: Agathe de Rambaud

Children of Charles Ferdinand, Duke of Berry
1819–1830: Marie Joséphine Louise, duchesse de Gontaut (1773–1857)

Notes

History of education in France
Ancien Régime
People of the Ancien Régime
Ancien Régime office-holders
Government of France
French monarchy
Education and training occupations
 
French nobility
Court titles in the Ancien Régime
Gendered occupations
French royal court